This is a detailed list of human spaceflights from 2011 to 2020.

Green indicates a suborbital flight (including flights that failed to attain intended orbit).

See also

List of human spaceflight programs
List of human spaceflights
List of human spaceflights, 1961–1970
List of human spaceflights, 1971–1980
List of human spaceflights, 1981–1990
List of human spaceflights, 1991–2000
List of human spaceflights, 2001–2010
List of human spaceflights, 2021–present

References
Vostok and Voskhod flight history
Mercury flight history
X-15 flight history (altitudes given in feet)
Gemini flight history
Apollo flight history (student resource)
Skylab flight history
Apollo-Soyuz flight history
Space Shuttle flight history infographic
Shenzhou flight history timeline
SpaceShipOne flight history
Soyuz MS-10 flight details
VSS Unity flight details

2011
2010
Spaceflight timelines
Human spaceflights, 2011-present
2010s-related lists